Kimberly Buys (born 23 April 1989) is a Belgian swimmer who competes in the Women's 100 metre butterfly. At the 2012 Summer Olympics she finished joint 19th overall in the heats in the women's 100 metre butterfly, and 29th in the women's 100 m backstroke. At the 2016 Olympics, she finished in 13th in the 100 m butterfly.

References

Belgian female backstroke swimmers
Living people
Olympic swimmers of Belgium
Swimmers at the 2012 Summer Olympics
Swimmers at the 2016 Summer Olympics
Belgian female butterfly swimmers
Belgian female medley swimmers
1989 births
Sportspeople from Sint-Niklaas
European Aquatics Championships medalists in swimming
21st-century Belgian women